Charles William "Pete" Conacher, Jr. (born July 29, 1932) is a Canadian retired professional ice hockey player who played 229 games in the National Hockey League between 1951 and 1957. The rest of his career, which lasted from 1951 to 1966, was mainly spent in the American Hockey League.

Conacher played with the Toronto Maple Leafs, Chicago Black Hawks, and New York Rangers. In 1959, Conacher played for the World Champion Belleville McFarlands. He is the son of NHL Hall of Famer, Charlie Conacher.

Junior hockey career
Pete Conacher began his hockey career in the Toronto Hockey League in 1943 with the Leaside PeeWee team. He went on to play for the North Toronto Kinsmen Terriers in the 1944-45 season; where he would go on to be a Minor Bantam finalist. At the age of 16, he became property of the Chicago Blackhawks but was sent to their Ontario Hockey Association affiliate, the Galt Black Hawks. He would play in Galt (now part of Cambridge, Ontario) for two seasons. His best offensive season came in 1951-'52 where he would score 120 points (53G, 67A) in 51 games. In 1952, he turned pro with the Chicago Blac Hhawks to play in the National Hockey League.

Professional hockey career
In his 13 years as a professional hockey player, he would also end up playing for the New York Rangers, Toronto Maple Leafs, Hershey Bears, St. Louis Flyers, and Buffalo Bisons (AHL). In 1959, he would play for the Belleville McFarlands and go on to win the World Championship in Prague. By the end of his professional hockey career, Pete had played 229 NHL regular season games, with 47 goals and 39 assists.

After ending his professional career in 1966, he would join the NHL Oldtimers Hockey Club and would play charity hockey games across Canada for the following 13 years. To this day, he still plays for the Oldtimers hockey team. Pete was recognized for his 1959 World Championship success with the Belleville McFarlands by being inducted into the Belleville Hall of Fame.

Personal life
Pete was also a past President of the Ontario chapter of Special Olympics Canada. During summers he was not playing hockey, he would play in the Beaches Major Fastball League and senior baseball for Lizzies at the old Viaduct Stadium. He has also served as a board member for the Charlie Conacher Throat Cancer Research Fund at the Toronto General Hospital. Pete and his wife Ann have lived in Etobicoke for the past 48 years. He currently sits on the Board of Directors with the Ontario Sports Hall of Fame.

Conacher's uncles, Lionel Conacher, and Roy Conacher, also played in the NHL and were later inducted into the Hall of Fame. His cousins, Lionel Conacher Jr., was a first round draft pick in 1960 for the Montreal Alouettes of the Canadian Football League. Another cousin Brian Conacher represented Canada at the 1964 Winter Olympics and played for the Toronto Maple Leafs, winning a Stanley Cup with them during the 1966–67 NHL season. Cory Conacher, formerly of the Tampa Bay Lightning, is also a distant relative of Pete's. He is also a cousin with Murray Henderson.

Career statistics

Regular season and playoffs

International

Awards and honours
 Belleville Hall of Fame
 Province of Ontario Special Achievement Award (1991)
 Ontario Special Olympics Hall of Fame (First Inductee, 1992)
 Queen Elizabeth II Golden Jubilee Medal (2002)
 Etobicoke Sports Hall of Fame (2002) 
 Bobby Orr Hall of Fame (2010)

References

External links
 

1932 births
Living people
Buffalo Bisons (AHL) players
Canadian ice hockey forwards
Canadian people of Scottish descent
Chicago Blackhawks players
Galt Black Hawks players
Galt Red Wings players
Hershey Bears players
Ontario Hockey Association Senior A League (1890–1979) players
New York Rangers players
St. Louis Flyers players
Ice hockey people from Toronto
Toronto Maple Leafs players